A list of films produced in Argentina in 1934:

1934
Films
Argentine